Lycée Franco-Péruvien (Francopé) is a French international school in Monterrico, Lima, Peru. It serves levels maternelle (preschool) through lycée (senior high school).

It was first established as École Nouvelle/Escuela Nueva in Miraflores in 1950. On August 30, 1959 André Malraux, the French Minister of Culture, laid the headstone of the school's new building. It moved to its current site in 1960.

See also
 France–Peru relations

References

External links
  Lycée Franco-Péruvien
  Lycée Franco-Péruvien

French international schools in South America
International schools in Lima
Private schools in Peru
1950 establishments in Peru
Educational institutions established in 1950